In baseball statistics, a double play (denoted as DP) is the act of making two outs during the same continuous play. 16 of the top 20 single-season totals were recorded between 1944 and 1980.

Key

List

Stats updated through the 2022 season

Other Hall of Famers

Notes

References

External links

Major League Baseball statistics
Double plays as a first baseman